Alberto Ramento y Baldovino (August 9, 1936 in Guimba, Nueva Ecija – October 3, 2006 in Tarlac City) was the ninth Supreme Bishop (Obispo Máximo) and former Chairperson of the Supreme Council of Bishops of the Philippine Independent Church or the Iglesia Filipina Independiente (IFI), and was known by the moniker, the "Bishop of Poor Peasants and Workers".

Life

Ramento was born to an affluent family. His grandfather Don Felix Ramento was Guimba's town mayor from 1922-1925 and Alberto had three uncles who were pioneer priests in the Iglesia Filipina Independiente. His father Felipe Ramento was also the chief of police in Guimba. The Ramento family owned several large plots of land inherited from the Baldovino clan, Alberto's mother's side. He was also a Freemason. Ramento was married to Celerina Mendoza of Hermosa, Bataan and had children namely: Alberto II (Aldos), Aleli, Alberto III (Altres), and Liezel.

Ramento was co-chair of the Ecumenical Bishops Forum, chaired the Promotion of Church People's Response–Central Luzon and human rights group Karapatan–Tarlac, and various church and cause-oriented organizations. He was an ardent supporter of the Hacienda Luisita strikers. As the chairman of the Workers Assistance Center, Inc., he also supported the struggle of the workers in Cavite, Philippines. He was also a vocal and influential critic of the Gloria Arroyo administration. He was also very vocal about the murder of IFI priest Fr. William Tadena, believed to be murdered by the Cojuangco family, for his support of the Hacienda Luisita farmers.

In September 1998, the National Democratic Front of the Philippines (NDFP) Negotiating Panel nominated him as an Independent Observer in the Joint Monitoring Committee (JMC) of the Comprehensive Agreement on Respect for Human Rights and International Humanitarian Law (CARHRIHL).

Death
Ramento was stabbed to death by unknown assailants. He was found dead with multiple stab wounds inside his rectory at San Sebastian Parish, Tarlac City in the early morning of October 3, 2006. His remains were cremated 10 days after his death.

Prior to his death, Ramento had been actively involved in various organizations and movements advocating human rights, social justice especially for the working class, civil liberties, and genuine peace.

The San Sebastian Parish Church was once temporarily closed for a number of years after Ramento's death but has since re-opened.

IFI created the "Ramento Project for Rights Defenders", the IFI's human rights advocacy and service arm, in his honor.

Veneration

He is venerated as a venerable and martyr both in the Philippine Independente Church and the Old Catholic Church, his feast day is celebrated every year on October 3.

References

External links
Official website of the Ramento Project for Rights Defenders

1936 births
2006 deaths
People from Tarlac City
People from Nueva Ecija
Filipino Christian religious leaders
Filipino bishops
Assassinated Filipino people
People murdered in the Philippines
Assassinated religious leaders
Members of the Philippine Independent Church
Bishops of Independent Catholic denominations
Anglo-Catholic bishops
Anglo-Catholic clergy
General Theological Seminary alumni
2006 murders in the Philippines
Filipino Freemasons